Franz Gall may refer to:
 Franz Joseph Gall (1758–1828), German neuroanatomist
 Franz Gall (general) (1884–1944), German World War II general